Thyronamine refers both to a molecule, and to derivatives of that molecule: a family of decarboxylated and deiodinated metabolites of the thyroid hormones thyroxine (T4) and 3,5,3'-triiodothyronine (T3).

Types
The group includes:

 Thyronamine (T0AM)
 3-Iodothyronamine (T1AM), which is the most notable one as it is a trace amine found in the nervous system. It is a possible candidate for the natural ligand of the trace amine-associated receptor TAAR1 (TAR1), an intracellular G protein-coupled receptor
 3,5-Diiodothyronamine (T2AM)
 3,5,3'-Triiodothyronamine (T3AM)

See also
 Trace amines
 Thyroid hormone

References

Biogenic amines
Phenethylamines
Phenols
Thyroid
TAAR1 agonists